Snail Mail is the American indie rock solo project of guitarist and singer-songwriter Lindsey Jordan (born June 16, 1999). Originally from Ellicott City, Maryland, Jordan first performed as Snail Mail live in 2015 at the age of 15, and attracted attention with the EP Habit in 2016. After signing with Matador Records, Snail Mail released her debut studio album, Lush (2018), to critical acclaim. In 2021, Snail Mail followed up with her second album, Valentine, to further critical recognition.

Early life
Lindsey Erin Jordan was raised in Ellicott City, Maryland, a suburb of Baltimore. Her mother is a lingerie store owner and her father works for a textbook publisher. Jordan had a Roman Catholic upbringing. She started playing guitar at the age of 5, and became captivated by the punk scene as a teenager. At the age of 8, Jordan saw Paramore live on the Riot! tour. She cited the experience as a "big moment" that inspired her to eventually form her own band. She played guitar for a church band and a jazz band at school. She started writing her own songs at around 12 and began booking her own sets at restaurants and coffee shops. In 2018, Jordan was admitted to St. Joseph's College in Brooklyn, but chose not to attend in order to focus on her career.

Career

Jordan released her self-recorded solo EP Sticki in 2015 with her new band as Snail Mail. She was joined by Ryan Vieira playing bass and Shawn Durham on the drums. In October 2015, Snail Mail performed her first live show at Baltimore's Unregistered Nurse festival alongside Sheer Mag, Screaming Females and Priests. The set attracted the attention of Priests, who subsequently recruited Jordan to their label Sister Polygon Records. After completing one short DIY tour in July 2016, Snail Mail released her first full EP Habit via Sister Polygon, produced by Priests' G.L. Jaguar and Coup Sauvage and the Snips's Jason Sauvage. The six-track EP received considerable coverage from the indie press. Pitchfork included the EP's opening track, "Thinning", in their "Best New Track" series.

Snail Mail, supported by bassist Alex Bass and drummer Ray Brown, toured North America extensively in 2017 supporting Priests, Girlpool, Waxahatchee and Beach Fossils. In September 2017, Jordan signed with Matador Records and performed her first Tiny Desk Concert for NPR Music. Snail Mail's first headlining tour began in January 2018. Snail Mail's debut full-length album Lush was released on June 8, 2018, to generally positive reviews from music critics. In 2019, she toured New Zealand, Australia, Canada, and the US, playing with artists such as Mac Demarco and Thundercat. In June 2019, Snail Mail released a new version of their song "Pristine" in Simlish for the new EA game The Sims 4: Island Living. That same month Matador Records digitally reissued Habit,  featuring a cover of "The 2nd Most Beautiful Girl in the World" by the band Courtney Love, headed by American musician Lois Maffeo.

Snail Mail released her second album, Valentine, on November 5, 2021. The album received widespread critical acclaim and appeared on multiple 2021 year-end lists. Regarding Valentine, Jordan stated: "Making this album has been the greatest challenge of my life thus far. I put my entire heart and soul into every last detail."

Her original set of US and UK tour dates were also set to begin in November 2021, but Jordan called off the tour shortly before it began due to her finding massive polyps in her vocal cords that needed to be operated on to prevent permanent damage to her voice.

In November 2022, Jordan announced through Variety that she would bring a hometown festival to Baltimore in early 2023 called "Snail Mail's Valentine Fest." The five-night run of shows will take place at the city's Ottobar venue, with a lineup of special guests that Jordan curated herself, and she told Variety that there are "some fucking insane bands on there."

Style and influences 
Snail Mail's music has been described as indie rock, and alternative rock. While earlier Snail Mail releases were noted for their spare, lo-fi guitar-driven sounds, Valentine embraced a richer sonic palette, incorporating synthesizers, strings and samples. Lindsay Zoladz of The New York Times noted Jordan's unconventional sense of melody and a preference for "murky" effects pedals, both exhibiting influences of 1990s indie rock. Her lyricism has been noted for its candid and introspective nature. Regarding her songwriting process, Jordan stated, "I have a really hard time writing from any place other than complete honesty within myself."

Jordan has cited Hayley Williams of Paramore, Liz Phair and Avril Lavigne as her idols and major musical inspirations. Her other influences include Fiona Apple, Cat Power, Elliott Smith, Bon Iver, Sufjan Stevens, My Bloody Valentine and Sheer Mag. Jordan has named Mary Timony her favorite guitarist, and received guitar lessons from Timony herself. Other guitarists who had inspired her include Marnie Stern, Kurt Vile, Steve Gunn and Mark Kozelek.

Personal life 
Jordan is openly gay. In an interview with The New Zealand Herald, Jordan stated that while coming out as gay "really developed who I am as a person", she "hated having to answer questions about being a woman and being gay and being young. All of it, to me, has nothing to do with the music." As of September 2021, she lives in New York City.

Accompanying band
Current members
Lindsey Jordan – vocals, guitar
Alex Bass – bass
Ray Brown – drums
Benjamin Kaunitz – guitar, backing vocals (2021–present)
Blaise O'Brien – keyboards, percussion, guitar (2022–present)

Past members
Madeline McCormack - keyboards, guitar (2019–2022)
Ian Eylanbekov – guitar (2018)
Kelton Young - guitar, backing vocals (2018)

Discography

Studio albums

Extended plays

Singles

Notes

Awards and nominations

References

External links
 
 
 
 

1999 births
Living people
21st-century American women singers
American rock guitarists
American indie rock musicians
American lesbian musicians
American LGBT singers
American LGBT songwriters
LGBT people from Maryland
Lesbian singers
Lesbian songwriters
Musical groups established in 2015
Musical groups from Baltimore
People from Ellicott City, Maryland
2015 establishments in Maryland
20th-century LGBT people
21st-century LGBT people
Matador Records artists